Copper-64 (64Cu) is a positron and beta emitting isotope of copper, with applications for molecular radiotherapy and positron emission tomography. Its unusually long half-life (12.7-hours) for a positron-emitting isotope makes it increasingly useful when attached to various ligands, for PET and PET-CT scanning.

Properties

64Cu has a half-life of 12.7 hours and decays 17.9% by positron emission to 64Ni, 39.0% by beta decay to 64Zn, 43.1% by electron capture to 64Ni, and 0.475% gamma radiation/internal conversion.  These emissions are 0.579 MeV, 0.653 MeV and 1.35 MeV for beta minus, positron, and gamma respectively.

The oxidation states of copper in biology are I and II since Cu3+ is too powerful to exist in biochemical systems. Furthermore, copper(I) exists as a strong complex in aqueous solution and is not often seen. Copper(II) forms mononuclear complexes that are paramagnetic and prefers ligands of sulfur and nitrogen.

Copper is essential in the human body as both a catalyst and as part of enzymes. Copper is mainly involved in redox reactions throughout the body, but also plays a role in iron transportation in blood plasma.

Production
Copper-64 can be technically reproduced by several different reactions with the most common methods using either a reactor or a particle accelerator. Thermal neutrons can produce 64Cu in low specific activity (the number of decays per second per amount of substance) and low yield through the 63Cu(n,γ)64Cu reaction. At the University of Missouri Research Reactor Center (MURR) 64Cu was produced using high-energy neutrons via the 64Zn(n,p)64Cu nuclear reaction in high specific activity but low yield.  Using a biomedical cyclotron the 64Ni(p,n)64Cu nuclear reaction can produce large quantities of the nuclide with high specific activity.

Applications
As a positron emitter, 64Cu has been used to produce experimental and clinical radiopharmaceuticals for the imaging of a range of conditions. Its beta emissions also raise the possibility of therapeutic applications. Compared to typical PET radionuclides it has a relatively long half-life, which can be advantageous for therapy, and for imaging certain physiological processes.

PET imaging

Bone metastases
Experimental preclinical work has shown that 64Cu linked to methanephosphonate functional groups has potential as a bone imaging agent.

Neuroendocrine tumors (NETs)

Neuroendocrine tumors (NETs) are localised clinically using a range of DOTA based radiopharmaceuticals. For PET imaging these are typically Gallium-68 based. A commercial 64Cu-DOTA-TATE product has been FDA approved for localization of somatostatin receptor positive NETs since 2020.

Prostate cancer
The Bombesin peptide has been shown to be overexpressed in BB2 receptors in prostate cancer.  CB-TE2A a stable chelation system for 64Cu was incorporated with Bombesin analogs for in vitro and in vivo studies of prostate cancer.  PET-CT imagining studies showed that it underwent uptake into prostate tumor xenografts selectively with decreased uptake into non target tissues.  Other preclinical studies have shown that by targeting the gastrin-releasing peptide receptor pancreatic and breast cancer can also be detected.

Renal perfusion
Ethylglyoxal bis(thiosemicarbazone) (ETS) has potential utility as a PET radiopharmaceutical with the various isotopes of copper. 64Cu-ETS has been used for experimental preclinical myocardial, cerebral and tumor perfusion evaluations, with a linear relationship between the renal uptake and blood flow.  Renal perfusion can also be evaluated with CT or MRI instead of PET, but with drawbacks: CT requires administration of potentially allergenic contrast agents. MRI avoids use of ionising radiation but is difficult to implement, and often suffers from motion artefacts. PET with 64Cu can offer quantitative measurements of renal perfusion.

Wilson’s disease
Wilson disease is a rare condition in which copper is retained excessively in the body. Toxic levels of copper can lead to organ failure and premature death. 64Cu has been used experimentally to study whole body retention of copper in subjects with this disease. The technique can also separate heterozygous carriers and homozygous normals.

Cancer therapy

64Cu-ATSM (diacetyl-bis(N4-methylthiosemicarbazone)) has been shown to increase the survival time of tumor-bearing animals.  Areas of low oxygen retention have been shown to be resistant to external beam radiotherapy because hypoxia reduces the lethal effects of ionizing radiation.  64Cu was believed to kill these cells because of its unique decay properties.  In animal models having colorectal tumors with and without induced hypoxia, Cu-ATSM was preferentially taken up by hypoxic cells over normoxic cells.  The results demonstrated that this compound increased survival of the tumor bearing hamsters compared with controls.

See also
Nuclear medicine
Radioactive tracer
Radionuclide
Radiopharmacology

References

Isotopes of copper
Positron emitters
Medical isotopes